The Asian water monitor (Varanus salvator) is a large varanid lizard native to South and Southeast Asia. It is one of the most common monitor lizards in Asia, ranging from coastal northeast India, Bangladesh, Sri Lanka, mainland Southeast Asia, and southern China to Indonesian islands where it lives close to water. It is listed as Least Concern on the IUCN Red List. It was described by Laurenti in 1768 and is among the largest squamates in the world.

Etymology
The generic name Varanus is derived from the Arabic waral, which translates as "monitor". The specific name is the Latin word for "saviour", denoting a possible religious connotation. The water monitor is occasionally confused with the crocodile monitor (V. salvadorii) because of their similar scientific names.

Some common names for the species are Malayan water monitor, common water monitor, two-banded monitor, rice lizard, ring lizard, plain lizard, no-mark lizard and water monitor etc.

Taxonomy 
Stellio salvator was the scientific name used by Josephus Nicolaus Laurenti in 1768 for a water monitor specimen.

The family Varanidae contains nearly 80 species of monitor lizards, all of which belong to the genus Varanus. There is a significant amount of taxonomic uncertainty within this species complex. Morphological analyses have begun to unravel this taxonomic uncertainty but molecular studies are needed to test and confirm the validity of certain groupings within this genus. Research initiatives such as these are very important to assess changes in conservation assessments.

Subspecies 

V. s. salvator is the nominate subspecies and is now restricted to Sri Lanka, where it is known as the kabaragoya (කබරගොයා) in Sinhala and kalawathan in Tamil.
V. s. andamanensis, the Andaman Islands water monitor, inhabits the Andaman Islands and the Southern Nicobar Islands.; the type locality is Port Blair.
V. s. bivittatus (Mertens 1959), the two-striped water monitor, is common to Java, Bali, Lombok, Sumbawa, Flores, Alor, Wetar, and some neighbouring islands within the Sunda archipelago in Indonesia; the type locality is Java.
V. s. macromaculatus, the Southeast Asian water monitor, is found in mainland Southeast Asia, Singapore, Sumatra, Borneo, and smaller associated offshore islands. The type specimen was captured in Thailand.
V. s. ziegleri, Ziegler's water monitor, is from Obi Island.
Varanus cumingi, Varanus marmoratus, and Varanus nuchalis were classified as subspecies until 2007, when they were elevated to full species.

The black water monitor from Thailand (type locality: Amphoe La-ngu, Satun Province and Thai-Malaysian border area was formerly the subspecies V. s. komaini, but now is regarded as a junior synonym and melanistic population of V. s. macromaculatus.

Description 

The water monitor is a large species of monitor lizard. However, they grow much larger throughout life, with males being larger than females. Adults rarely exceed  in length, but the largest specimen on record, from Sri Lanka, measured . A common mature weight of V. salvator can be .

Another study from the same area by the same authors similarly estimated mean body mass for mature specimens at  while yet another study found a series of adults to weigh . In exceptional cases, the species has been reported to reach , though most such reports are unverified and may be unreliable.

They are the world's second-heaviest lizard, after the Komodo dragon. Their bodies are muscular, with long, powerful, laterally compressed tails. The scales in this species are keeled; scales found on top of the head have been noted to be larger than those located on the back. Water monitors are often defined by their dark brown or blackish coloration with yellow spots found on their underside - these yellow markings have a tendency to disappear gradually with age. This species is also denoted by the blackish band with yellow edges extending back from each eye. These monitors have very long necks and an elongated snout. They use their powerful jaws, serrated teeth and sharp claws for both predation and defense.

In captivity, Asian water monitors' life expectancy has been determined to be anywhere between 11–25 years depending on conditions, in the wild it is considerably shorter.

Distribution and habitat 

The Asian water monitor is widely distributed from India, Bangladesh, Sri Lanka, Myanmar and Thailand, Cambodia, Laos, Vietnam, the Chinese Guangxi and Hainan provinces, Malaysia, Singapore to the Sunda islands Sumatra, Java, Bali, Borneo and Sulawesi. It inhabits primarily lowland freshwater and brackish wetlands.

The Asian water monitor is semiaquatic and opportunistic; it inhabits a variety of natural habitats though predominantly resides in primary forests and mangrove swamps. It has been noted that it is not deterred from living in areas of human disturbance. In fact, it has been known to adapt and thrive in agricultural areas as well as cities with canal systems, such as in Sri Lanka, where they are not hunted or persecuted. Habitats that are considered to be most important are mangrove vegetation, swamps, wetlands, and elevations below . It does not thrive in habitats with extensive loss of natural vegetation and aquatic resources.

Behaviour and ecology 

Water monitors defend themselves using their tails, claws, and jaws. They are excellent swimmers, using the raised fin on their tails to steer through water. When encountering smaller prey items, the water monitor will subdue it in its jaws and proceed to violently thrash its neck, destroying the prey’s organs and spine which leaves it dead or incapacitated. The lizard will then proceed to swallow it whole.

In dominantly aquatic habitats their semiaquatic behavior is considered to provide a measure of safety from predators. Paired with their generalist diet, this is thought to contribute to their ecological plasticity. When hunted by predators such as the king cobra (Ophiophagus hannah) they will climb trees using their powerful legs and claws. If this evasion is not enough to escape danger, they have also been known to jump from trees into streams for safety, a tactic similar to that of the green iguana (Iguana iguana).

Like the Komodo dragon, the water monitor will often eat carrion. They have a keen sense of smell and can smell a carcass from far away. They are known to feed on dead human bodies. While on the one hand their presence can be helpful in locating a missing person in forensic investigations, on the other hand they can inflict further injuries to the corpse, complicating ascertainment of the cause of death.

The first description of the water monitor and its behaviour in English literature was made in 1681 by Robert Knox, who observed it during his long confinement in the Kingdom of Kandy: "There is a Creature here called Kobberaguion, resembling an Alligator. The biggest may be five or six feet long, speckled black and white. He lives most upon the Land, but will take the water and dive under it: hath a long blue forked tongue like a sting, which he puts forth and hisseth and gapeth, but doth not bite nor sting, tho the appearance of him would scare those that knew not what he was. He is not afraid of people, but will lie gaping and hissing at them in the way, and will scarce stir out of it. He will come and eat Carrion with the Dogs and Jackals, and will not be scared away by them, but if they come near to bark or snap at him, with his tail, which is long like a whip, he will so slash them, that they will run away and howl."

Water monitors are prone to attacking humans when threatened, and should be handled with caution. The bite of a water monitor can inflict a severe injury.

Diet 

They are carnivores, and consume a wide range of prey. They are known to eat fish, frogs, rodents, birds, crabs, and snakes. They have also been known to eat turtles, as well as young crocodiles and crocodile eggs. Water monitors have been observed eating catfish in a fashion similar to a mammalian carnivore, tearing off chunks of meat with their sharp teeth while holding it with their front legs and then separating different parts of the fish for sequential consumption.

The diet of the Asian water monitor in an urban area in central Thailand includes fish, crabs, Malayan snail-eating turtles (Malayemys macrocephala), Chinese edible frogs (Hoplobatrachus rugulosus), birds, small rodents, domestic cats (Felis catus) and dogs (Canis familiaris), chickens (Gallus gallus domesticus), food scraps and carcass. The stomachs of 20 adult Asian water monitors caught on Redang Island contained mostly human food waste, followed by turtle eggs and hatchlings, crabs and lizard eggs.

Venom
The possibility of venom in the genus Varanus is widely debated. Previously, venom was thought to be unique to Serpentes (snakes) and Heloderma (venomous lizards). The aftereffects of a Varanus bite were thought to be due to oral bacteria alone, but recent studies have shown venom glands are likely to be present in the mouths of several, if not all, of the species. The venom may be used as a defensive mechanism to fend off predators, to help digest food, to sustain oral hygiene, and possibly to help in capturing and killing prey.

Predation 
Adult water monitors have few natural predators, and are only known to be preyed on by saltwater crocodiles (Crocodylus porosus).

Threats 

Monitor lizards are traded globally and are the most common type of lizard to be exported from Southeast Asia, with 8.1 million exported between 1998 and 2007 for the international leather market. The Asian water monitor is one of the most exploited varanids; its skin is used for fashion accessories such as shoes, belts and handbags which are shipped globally, with as many as 1.5 million skins traded annually. Other uses include a perceived remedy for skin ailments and eczema, novelty food in Indonesia, and a perceived aphrodisiac, and as pets. In India, several tribal communities hunt these monitor lizards for their meat, fat and skin and the eggs are also harvested. They are often considered as pests and their populations are also threatened by habitat loss and habitat fragmentation.

Conservation 

In Nepal, it is a protected species under the Wild Animals Protection Act of 2002. In Hong Kong, it is a protected species under Wild Animals Protection Ordinance Cap 170. In Malaysia, this species is one of the most common wild animals, with numbers comparable to the population of macaques there. Although many fall victim to humans via roadkill and animal cruelty, they still thrive in most states of Malaysia, especially in the shrubs of the east coast states such as Pahang and Terengganu. In Thailand, all monitor lizards are protected species. It is still common in large urban areas in Thailand and is frequently seen in Bangkok's canals and parks. Because of this, it is currently listed as Least Concern in the IUCN Red List. These classifications have been made on the basis that this species maintains a geographically wide distribution, can be found in a variety of habitats, adapts to habitats disturbed by humans, and is abundant in portions of its range despite large levels of harvesting.

Loss of habitat and hunting has exterminated water monitors from most of mainland India.  In other areas they survive despite being hunted, due in part to the fact that larger ones, including large females that breed large numbers of eggs, have tough skins that are not desirable.

In Sri Lanka, it is protected by local people who value its predation of "crabs that would otherwise undermine the banks of rice fields". It is also protected as it eats venomous snakes.

The species is listed in Appendix II of the Convention on International Trade in Endangered Species (CITES) meaning international trade (import/export) in specimens (including parts and derivatives) is regulated.

References

Further reading

External links 

 Animal Diversity Web
 JCVI.org
 The New Reptile Database

Varanus
Reptiles of Bangladesh
Reptiles of Brunei
Reptiles of Cambodia
Reptiles of Hong Kong
Reptiles of India
Reptiles of Indonesia
Reptiles of Laos
Reptiles of Malaysia
Reptiles of Myanmar
Reptiles of the Philippines
Reptiles of Sri Lanka
Reptiles of Thailand
Reptiles of Vietnam
Reptiles of Borneo
Reptiles described in 1768
Taxa named by Josephus Nicolaus Laurenti
Articles containing video clips